Ghanta Karna (also known as Ghanta Karna Chaturdasi and Gathe Mangal) is a Nepalese Newari festival celebrating the defeat of the mythical demon Ghanta-karna ("bell-ears") or "Gatha-Mungal" in local Newari language. According to the myth, the demon wore bell earrings in order to drown out the name of the god Shiva with their jingling. Attributed to him are acts of robbery, murder, and kidnapping of children.  The festival takes place during the month of Shrawan (July/August).

References

Sources
 Festivals in Nepal

Festivals in Nepal
July observances
August observances
Observances set by the Vikram Samvat calendar